Tariku may refer to:

Tariku River, a river in the Papua province of Indonesia
Tariku language, one of the Lakes Plain languages
Tarikuiyeh, village in Kerman Province, Iran, also known as Tārīkū

Name
Tariku (Amharic: ታሪኩ) is a male name of Ethiopian origin that may refer to:

Tariku Bekele (born 1987), Ethiopian long-distance runner and Olympic medallist
Tariku Jufar (born 1984), Ethiopian marathon runner
Nahom Mesfin Tariku (born 1989), Ethiopian steeplechase runner

Amharic-language names